Jeff Flake (born 1962) was a U.S. Senator from Arizona from 2013 to 2019. Senator Flake may refer to:

Jake Flake (1935–2008), Arizona State Senate
Jeff Flake (Florida politician) (1877–1971), Florida State Senate